Rubén Fernando Carvallo Muñoz (born September 24, 1948), known as Fernando Carvallo, is a former Chilean footballer and currently a football manager.

International career
He made three appearances for the Chile national team in 1972.

Managerial career
Carvallo's first coaching experience was in 1990  when he coached the first team of Universidad Católica for a short time. In 1996, he signed again as the coach of the team and won the 1997 Apertura. He left the club in 1999 and retired from coaching, but in 2002 was signed as coach of Palestino. Later, he coached Unión Española and lost the final of 2004 Clausura with Cobreloa. He returned to Palestino in 2005 and again to Unión Española in 2006. In 2007, he replaced José del Solar in the UC, but after an irregular campaign with the team, he quit and was replaced by Mario Lepe. From 2011 to 2012, he was the manager of Chile at under-20 level.

After two experiences as Sports Director for both Colo-Colo (2015–16) and Magallanes (2019), he retired from football and spends time playing paddle tennis.

In December 2022, Carvallo returned to the football activity by joining Deportes Iquique as head of the youth system.

Personal life
His father was the Chile international footballer Hernán Carvallo, and his younger brother is the also former footballer Luis Hernán Carvallo. All three played for Universidad Católica.

Honours

Player
Universidad Católica
 Primera División de Chile: 1966

Unión Española
 Primera División de Chile: 1973

Manager
Universidad Católica
 Primera División de Chile: 1997 Apertura

References

External links
 Fernando Carvallo renunció a la banca de Universidad Católica at www.secundarios.cl 

1948 births
Living people
Footballers from Santiago
Chilean footballers
Chile international footballers
Club Deportivo Universidad Católica footballers
Unión San Felipe footballers
Unión Española footballers
Cádiz CF players
Chilean Primera División players
Segunda División players
Chilean expatriate footballers
Chilean expatriate sportspeople in Spain
Expatriate footballers in Spain
Chilean football managers
Club Deportivo Universidad Católica managers
Club Deportivo Palestino managers
Unión Española managers
Chile national under-20 football team managers
Chilean Primera División managers
Association football midfielders